Brian Munzlinger (born April 24, 1956) is an American politician and farmer from the state of Missouri. A Republican, he is a former member of the Missouri Senate who served the 18th District from 2011 to 2019.

Personal
Brian Munzlinger was born in Quincy, Illinois but raised in rural Lewis County, Missouri. He is a graduate of the University of Missouri, with a B.S. degree in general agriculture.  Munzlinger, a third-generation Missouri farmer, his wife, Michele and their two children reside on their farm near Williamstown, Missouri. He attends Williamstown Christian Church, and is a member of the Missouri Farm Bureau, the Missouri Corn Growers Association, the Missouri Soybean Association, the Missouri Cattleman's Association, the Missouri Chamber of Commerce, NFIB, and the University of Missouri Alumni Association.  Brian is a member of the National Rifle Association and previously served as a rifle and pistol instructor for the 4-H.

Politics
Munzlinger was first elected to represent the 1st District in the Missouri House of Representatives in November 2002, and reelected in 2004, 2006, and 2008. Due to Missouri's term limits he was prevented from running for the House again in 2010. Munzlinger chose to continue his political career at the next level by running for Missouri Senate from the 18th District in 2010. Munzlinger defeated incumbent Democrat Wes Shoemyer.

Electoral history

References

External links
 http://www.senate.mo.gov/11info/members/mem18.htm

1956 births
Living people
People from Quincy, Illinois
People from Lewis County, Missouri
University of Missouri alumni
Farmers from Missouri
Republican Party members of the Missouri House of Representatives
Republican Party Missouri state senators
21st-century American politicians